Australia competed at the 1948 Summer Olympics in London, England.  75 competitors, 66 men and 9 women, took part in 52 events in 11 sports. Australian athletes have competed in every Summer Olympic Games.

Medalists

Athletics

Key
Note–Ranks given for track events are within the athlete's heat only
Q = Qualified for the next round
q = Qualified for the next round as a fastest loser or, in field events, by position without achieving the qualifying target
NR = National record
N/A = Round not applicable for the event
Bye = Athlete not required to compete in round
NP = Not placed

Men
Track & road events

Men
Field Events

Combined events – Decathlon

Women
Track & road events

Women
Field events

Boxing

Cycling

Six cyclists, all men, represented Australia in 1948.

Road races
Individual times added to together for team race, 3 times needed for team event.

Track 
Ranks given are within the heat.

Diving

Rowing

Australia had eight male rowers participate in three out of seven rowing events in 1948.

Ranks given are within the heat.

Sailing

Shooting

Swimming

Ranks given are within the heat.

 Men

 Women

Water polo

This was the first time Australia had entered the water polo competition.

Men's Team Competition

Head coach: 

Group D

Weightlifting

Wrestling

Men's Freestyle

References

Nations at the 1948 Summer Olympics
1948
Olympics